Bruce Manning Metzger (February 9, 1914 – February 13, 2007) was an American biblical scholar, Bible translator and textual critic who was a longtime professor at Princeton Theological Seminary and Bible editor who served on the board of the American Bible Society and United Bible Societies. He was a scholar of Greek, New Testament, and New Testament textual criticism, and wrote prolifically on these subjects. Metzger was one of the most influential New Testament scholars of the 20th century. He was elected to the American Philosophical Society in 1986.

Biography 
Metzger was born on February 9, 1914, in Middletown, Pennsylvania, and earned his BA (1935) at Lebanon Valley College. Metzger had strong academic training in Greek before enrolling in Princeton Seminary, and in the summer prior to entering the Seminary, he completed reading through the entire Bible consecutively for the twelfth time. He received his ThB in 1938 at Princeton Theological Seminary, and in the autumn of 1938 began teaching at Princeton as a Teaching Fellow in New Testament Greek. On April 11, 1939, he was ordained in the United Presbyterian Church of North America, which has since merged with the Presbyterian Church in the United States of America (PCUSA) and is now known as the Presbyterian Church (USA). In 1940, he earned his MA from Princeton University and became an instructor in New Testament. Two years later, he earned his PhD ("Studies in a Greek Gospel Lectionary (Greg. 303)"), also from Princeton University.

In 1944, Metzger married Isobel Elizabeth Mackay, daughter of the third president of the Seminary, the Scot, John A. Mackay. That year, he was promoted to Assistant Professor. In 1948, he became Associate Professor, and full Professor in 1954. In 1964, Metzger was named the George L. Collord Professor of New Testament Language and Literature. In 1969, he was elected to membership in the Catholic Biblical Association. In 1971, he was elected president of both the Studiorum Novi Testamenti Societas and the Society of Biblical Literature. The following year, he became president of the North American Patristic Society. Metzger was visiting fellow at Clare Hall, Cambridge in 1974 and Wolfson College, Oxford in 1979. In 1978, he was elected corresponding fellow of the British Academy, the Academy's highest distinction for persons who are not residents in the United Kingdom. In 1986, Metzger became a member of the American Philosophical Society. At the age of seventy, after teaching at Princeton Theological Seminary for a period of forty-six years, he retired as Professor Emeritus. In 1994, Bruce Metzger was honoured with the Burkitt Medal for Biblical Studies by the British Academy. He was awarded honorary doctorates from Lebanon Valley College, Findlay College, the University of St Andrews, the University of Münster and Potchefstroom University. "Metzger's unrivaled knowledge of the relevant languages, ancient and modern; his balanced judgment; and his painstaking attention to detail won him respect across the theological and academic spectrum." Conservative evangelical scholar Daniel B. Wallace described Metzger as "a fine, godly, conservative scholar, although his view of biblical authority is not quite the same as many other evangelicals."

Shortly after his 93rd birthday, Metzger died in Princeton, New Jersey, on February 13, 2007. He was survived by his wife Isobel, who would die at the age of 98 on July 27, 2016 in Princeton, New Jersey, as well as their two sons, John Mackay Metzger and Dr. James Bruce Metzger.

Books and commentaries

Metzger edited and provided commentary for many Bible translations and wrote dozens of books. He was an editor of the United Bible Societies' standard Greek New Testament, the starting point for nearly all recent New Testament translations. In 1952, he became a contributor to the Revised Standard Version (RSV) of the Bible, and was general editor of the Reader's Digest Bible (a condensed version of the RSV) in 1982. From 1977 to 1990, he chaired the Committee on Translators for the New Revised Standard Version (NRSV) of the Bible and was "largely responsible for ... seeing [the NRSV] through the press." He considered it a privilege to present the NRSV—which includes the books referred to as Apocrypha by Protestants, though Roman Catholics and Eastern Orthodox consider them deuterocanonical—to Pope John Paul II and Patriarch Demetrius I of Constantinople.

Central to his scholarly contribution to New Testament studies is his trilogy: The Text of the New Testament: Its Transmission, Corruption, and Restoration (1964; 2nd ed., 1968; 3d enlarged ed., 1992); The Early Versions of the New Testament: Their Origin, Transmission, and Limitations (1977); The Canon of the New Testament: Its Origin, Development, and Significance (1987). The first volume of a series that he founded and edited, New Testament Tools and Studies, appeared in 1960.

Metzger's commentaries often utilize historical criticism and higher criticism, which attempt to explain the literary and historical origins of the Bible and the biblical canon. For instance, Metzger argues that the early church which assembled the New Testament did not consider divine inspiration to be a sufficient criterion for a book to be placed in the canon. Metzger says that the early church saw it as very important that a work describing Jesus' life be written by a follower of or an eyewitness to Jesus, and considered other works such as The Shepherd of Hermas and the Epistles of Clement to be inspired but not canonical.

In discussing the canon, Metzger identifies three criteria “for acceptance of particular writings as sacred, authoritative, and worthy of being read in services of worship...”, criteria which were “generally adopted during the course of the second century, and were never modified thereafter”, namely, orthodoxy (conformity to the rule of faith), apostolicity, and consensus among the churches. He concludes that, “In the most basic sense neither individuals nor councils created the canon; instead they came to recognize and acknowledge the self-authenticating quality of these writings, which imposed themselves as canonical upon the church.”

Works

List of books

 – note: "occuring" is misspelled in the published title

List of translations

Selected articles and chapters

 - Presidential Address, Studiorum Novi Testamenti Societas, delivered August 24, 1971, at Noordwijkerhout, The Netherlands.
 - Presidential address, Society of Biblical Literature, delivered October 29, 1971, in Atlanta, Georgia.

Selected interviews and writings about Bruce M. Metzger

Festschriften

References

External links
Obituary from Society of Biblical Literature
Tribute from Ben Witherington
Tribute from Daniel B. Wallace

1914 births
2007 deaths
People from Middletown, Pennsylvania
Presbyterians from Pennsylvania
Presbyterian Church (USA) teaching elders
United Presbyterian Church in the United States of America ministers
American Christian writers
Christian scholars
American biblical scholars
Translators of the Bible into English
Princeton Theological Seminary faculty
Princeton Theological Seminary alumni
Lebanon Valley College alumni
Corresponding Fellows of the British Academy
New Testament scholars
Textual scholarship
20th-century American non-fiction writers
20th-century translators
20th-century American clergy
Members of the American Philosophical Society